Daniel Santafé Mena (born 3 July 1997) is a Spanish professional footballer who plays as a midfielder for Greek Super League club Asteras Tripolis.

References

1997 births
Living people
Spanish footballers
Spanish expatriate footballers
Spanish expatriate sportspeople in Greece
Expatriate footballers in Greece
Super League Greece players
Segunda División B players
Tercera División players
Asteras Tripolis F.C. players
CA Osasuna B players
CA Osasuna players
Association football midfielders